Bernard Murphy may refer to:
Bernard Murphy (footballer), Scottish footballer
Bernard Murphy (bishop), Roman Catholic bishop
Bernard Murphy (judge), Australian judge

See also
Bernie Murphy, Irish hurler and Gaelic footballer